George William Gaidzik (February 22, 1885 – August 25, 1938) was an American diver, who competed in the 1908 Summer Olympics and 1912 Summer Olympics. He was born in Chicago and died on Lake Michigan.

Olympic career
In the 1908 Summer Olympics he won a bronze medal in the 3 metre springboard event and was fifth in the 10 metre platform event. Four years later, at the 1912 Summer Olympics, he was eighth in the 3 metre springboard event, was sixth in his first round heat in the 10 metre platform event and second in his first round heat in the Plain high diving event, and did not advance on both occasions.

References

External links
 
 

1885 births
1938 deaths
American male divers
Olympic bronze medalists for the United States in diving
Divers at the 1908 Summer Olympics
Divers at the 1912 Summer Olympics
Medalists at the 1908 Summer Olympics
Sportspeople from Chicago